Dioryctria mendacella is a species of snout moth in the genus Dioryctria. It was described by Staudinger in 1859, and is known from the Iberian Peninsula, Italy, France and Croatia, Greece and Cyprus.

The wingspan is 28–31 mm.

References

Moths described in 1859
mendacella
Moths of Europe